Callithamnion roseum is a type of red algae (a red seaweed).

Distribution
Callithamnion roseum is found in Europe, islands in the Atlantic, the Western Atlantic and Africa.

References

External links 
 

Ceramiales
Plants described in 1849